Lafut may refer to:
 Lafut-e Bala
 Lafut-e Pain